In the Ming dynasty times, most titles abolished during the Southern Song were restored. The Ming dynasty developed less complicated system of royal titles. Princesse's consort was granted a title of fuma (驸马都尉), meaning "commander of imperial chariot", whereas consort to daughter of imperial prince was styled as yibin (仪宾). 

The following list includes Ming dynasty princes consorts and imperial princesses.

Daughters of the emperors

Daughters of Emperor Renzu

Daughters of the Hongwu Emperor

Daughters of the Yongle Emperor

Daughters of the Hongxi Emperor

Daughters of the Xuande Emperor

Daughters of the Emperor Yingzong of Ming

Daughters of the Jingtai Emperor

Daughters of the Chenghua Emperor

Daughters of the Jiajing Emperor

Daughters of the Longqing Emperor

Daughters of the Wanli Emperor

Daughters of the Taichang Emperor

Daughters of the Chongzhen Emperor

Daughters of the imperial princes

Sons of the Emperor Renzu

Sons of the Hongwu Emperor

Line of Zhu Biao, Crown Prince Yiwen

Prince of Qin peerage

Cadet lines

Prince of Jin

Cadet lines

Prince of Zhou

Cadet lines

Prince of Chu

Cadet lines

Prince of Lu

Cadet lines

Prince of Shu

Prince of Dai

Cadet lines 

Prince of Changhua

Prince of Ningjin

Prince of Su

Cadet lines

Prince of Liao

Cadet lines

Prince of Qing

Cadet lines

Prince of Ning

Cadet lines

Prince of Han

Cadet lines

Prince of Shen 

Cadet lines

Prince of Tang

Cadet lines

Prince of Yi 

Cadet lines

Sons of the Chenghua Emperor

Prince of Xing

References

 
Chinese royal titles